The 1895 Kansas Jayhawks football team represented the University of Kansas in the Western Interstate University Football Association (WIUFA) during the 1895 college football season. In their second season under head coach Hector Cowan, the Jayhawks compiled a 6–1 record (2–1 against WIUFA opponents), tied for the WIUFA championship, shut out five of seven opponents, and outscored all opponents by a combined total of 192 to 14. The team's only loss came against Missouri in the final game of the season. The Jayhawks played their home games at McCook Field in Lawrence, Kansas. W. H. Piatt was the team captain.

Schedule

References

Kansas
Kansas Jayhawks football seasons
Kansas Jayhawks football